Shadows of Tombstone is a 1953 American Western film directed by William Witney and starring Rex Allen, Jeanne Cooper and Slim Pickens.

The film's art direction was by Frank Hotaling.

Plot

Cast

References

Bibliography
 Bernard A. Drew. Motion Picture Series and Sequels: A Reference Guide. Routledge, 2013.

External links
 

1953 films
1953 Western (genre) films
American Western (genre) films
Films directed by William Witney
Republic Pictures films
American black-and-white films
1950s English-language films
1950s American films